The 2021 Nitro Rallycross Championship was the first year of Nitro Rallycross (Nitro RX) competition as a standalone series. The season began on September 24–25 at Utah Motorsports Campus and ended at the Florida International Rally & Motorsports Park on December 4–5.

Schedule
The 2021 schedule was revealed on March 11, 2021. A revised calendar came out on June 17 following the closure of Wild West Motorsports Park; the track was replaced by Glen Helen Raceway.

Drivers

Supercar

NEXT

Results and standings

Results

Drivers' championship

Supercar

NEXT

Notes

References

Nitro